Government of Korea may refer to:
Government of South Korea, the modern government which controls the southern portion of the Korean peninsula
Government of North Korea, the modern government which controls the northern portion of Korean peninsula
United States Army Military Government in Korea, which controlled the southern portion of the Korean Peninsula from 1945 to 1948
Provisional Government of the Republic of Korea, a government-in-exile established in 1919
Korea under Japanese rule, for the government which controlled Korea from 1910 to 1945
List of monarchs of Korea, for governments before 1910